The College of Humanities & Fine Arts (in full, University of Massachusetts Amherst College of Humanities and Fine Arts) is a college of the University of Massachusetts Amherst. The college was founded in 1915.

Departments

Programs

MFA Program for Poets & Writers
The MFA Program for Poets & Writers is a graduate creative writing program founded in 1963 and is part of the English Department at the College of Humanities and Fine Arts.

References

External links 
 College of Humanities and Fine Arts official site

University of Massachusetts Amherst schools
University subdivisions in Massachusetts